David Lea may refer to:
 David Lea (Australian politician)
 David Lea, Baron Lea of Crondall, British trade unionist and politician